The Omega Nebula, also known as the Swan Nebula, Checkmark Nebula, Lobster Nebula, and the Horseshoe Nebula (catalogued as Messier 17 or M17 or NGC 6618) is an H II region in the constellation Sagittarius. It was discovered by Philippe Loys de Chéseaux in 1745. Charles Messier catalogued it in 1764. It is by some of the richest starfields of the Milky Way, figuring in the northern two-thirds of Sagittarius.

Characteristics 
The Omega Nebula is between 5,000 and 6,000 light-years from Earth and it spans some 15 light-years in diameter. The cloud of interstellar matter of which this nebula is a part is roughly 40 light-years in diameter and has a mass of 30,000 solar masses. The total mass of the Omega Nebula is an estimated 800 solar masses.

It is considered one of the brightest and most massive star-forming regions of our galaxy. Its local geometry is similar to the Orion Nebula except that it is viewed edge-on rather than face-on.

The open cluster NGC 6618 lies embedded in the nebulosity and causes the gases of the nebula to shine due to radiation from these hot, young stars; however, the actual number of stars in the nebula is much higher – up to 800, 100 of spectral type earlier than B9, and 9 of spectral type O, plus over a thousand stars in formation on its outer regions. It is also one of the youngest clusters known, with an age of just 1 million years.

The luminous blue variable HD 168607, in the south-east part of the nebula, is generally assumed to be associated with it; its close neighbor, the blue hypergiant HD 168625, may be too.

The Swan portion of M17, the Omega Nebula in the Sagittarius nebulosity is said to resemble a barber's pole.

Early research 
The first attempt to accurately draw the nebula (as part of a series of sketches of nebulae) was made by John Herschel in 1833, and published in 1836. He described the nebula as such:

A second, more detailed sketch was made during his visit to South Africa in 1837. The nebula was also studied by Johann von Lamont and separately by an undergraduate at Yale College, Mr Mason, starting from around 1836. When Herschel published his 1837 sketch in 1847, he wrote:

Sketches were also made by William Lassell in 1862 using his four-foot telescope at Malta, and by M. Trouvelot from Cambridge, Massachusetts and Edward Singleton Holden in 1875 using the twenty-six inch Clark refractor at the United States Naval Observatory.

Gallery

See also 
 List of Messier objects
 Messier object
 New General Catalogue

References

External links

 
 Messier 17, SEDS Messier pages
 Omega Nebula at ESA/Hubble
 
 Omega Nebula (Messier 17) at Constellation Guide

Carina–Sagittarius Arm
H II regions
Messier objects
NGC objects
Sagittarius (constellation)
Sharpless objects
?
Articles containing video clips
Star-forming regions